Protein FAM32A is a protein that in humans is encoded by the FAM32A gene.

References

Further reading